The 1808 United States presidential election in Connecticut took place between November 4 and December 7, 1808, as part of the 1808 United States presidential election. The state legislature chose nine representatives, or electors to the Electoral College, who voted for President and Vice President.

During this election, Connecticut cast its nine electoral votes to Federalist candidate Charles Cotesworth Pinckney. 4 of the 5 New England states voted for Pinckney, barring Vermont, which voted for Democratic Republican candidate and Secretary of State James Madison, who nationally won the election.

See also
 United States presidential elections in Connecticut

References

Connecticut
1808
1808 Connecticut elections